Aleksey Alekseyevich Gerasimov (born 15 April 1993) is a Russian football player who plays as a centre-back for KAMAZ Naberezhnye Chelny on loan from Ural Yekaterinburg.

Career
He made his professional debut in the Russian Football National League for FC SKA-Energiya Khabarovsk on 24 August 2014 in a game against FC Sibir Novosibirsk.

In July 2015, Gerasimov, along with Elbeyi Guliyev, moved on loan to Kazakhstan Premier League side FC Zhetysu.

He made his Russian Premier League debut for FC Ural Yekaterinburg on 28 June 2020 in a game against FC Tambov, as a starter, seven years after he was first registered as Ural player.

On 11 January 2023, Gerasimov moved on loan to KAMAZ Naberezhnye Chelny until the end of the 2022–23 season.

Career statistics

References

External links

1993 births
People from Borisoglebsk
Sportspeople from Voronezh Oblast
Living people
Russian footballers
Association football defenders
FC Ural Yekaterinburg players
FC SKA-Khabarovsk players
FC Zhetysu players
FC Nizhny Novgorod (2015) players
FC Belshina Bobruisk players
FC Tom Tomsk players
FC KAMAZ Naberezhnye Chelny players
Russian First League players
Kazakhstan Premier League players
Belarusian Premier League players
Russian Second League players
Russian Premier League players
Russian expatriate footballers
Expatriate footballers in Kazakhstan
Russian expatriate sportspeople in Kazakhstan
Expatriate footballers in Belarus
Russian expatriate sportspeople in Belarus